Shabbir Jan is a Pakistani television actor who has appeared in many TV drama serials, such as Wafa, Makan, Andata, Survival of a Woman, Zindagi Dhoop Tum Ghana Saya, Umrao Jaan, Jangloos, Shab e Gham, and many others.

Career

Shabbir Jan won the PTV Best Actor award three times. He has been a nominee once for the Best Actor award in the Lux Style Awards in 2010. He started working as a TV actor in the late 1970s.

Filmography

Films

Television

Awards and recognition
Pride of Performance Award by the President of Pakistan in 2019.

References

External links
 

Living people
Pakistani male film actors
Pakistani male television actors
Place of birth missing (living people)
Recipients of the Pride of Performance
PTV Award winners
Year of birth missing (living people)